Thiazolines (or dihydrothiazoles) are a group of isomeric 5-membered heterocyclic compounds containing both sulfur and nitrogen in the ring.  Although unsubstituted thiazolines are rarely encountered themselves, their derivatives are more common and some are bioactive.  For example, in a common post-translational modification, cysteine residues are converted into thiazolines.

The name thiazoline originates from the Hantzsch–Widman nomenclature.

Isomers

Three structural isomers  of thiazoline exist depending on the position of the double bond. These forms do not readily interconvert and hence are not tautomers. Of these 2-thiazoline is the most common.

A fourth structure exists in which the N and S atoms are adjacent; this known as isothiazoline.

Synthesis
Thiazolines were first prepared by dialkylation of thioamides by Richard Willstatter in 1909. 2-Thiazolines are commonly prepared from 2-aminoethanethiols (e.g. cysteamine). They may also be synthesized via the Asinger reaction.

Applications
Many molecules contain thiazoline rings, one example being Firefly luciferin, the light-emitting molecule in fireflies.  The amino acid cysteine is produced industrially from substituted thiazole. 2-Aminothiazoline-4-carboxylic acid is an intermediate in the industrial synthesis of L-cysteine.

See also
 Thiazole - an analogue with 2 double bonds
 Thiazolidine - an analogue with no double bonds
 Oxazoline - an analogue with O in place of S

References